Neil Turnbull (born 21 July 1959) is an English-Canadian football manager.

Career
Turnbull earned his Canada Soccer "B" coaching licence in 1984, and later his "A" license. He served as the program director of Alberta Soccer, before becoming the first head coach of the Canada women's national team in 1986. He coached the team until 1991, leading Canada at the 1988 FIFA Women's Invitation Tournament and 1991 CONCACAF Women's Championship. He later returned from 1996 to 15 August 1999, coaching the team at the 1998 CONCACAF Women's Championship, which Canada won, and 1999 FIFA Women's World Cup.

Personal life
Turnbull was born and raised in Newcastle upon Tyne, England. He earned a degree in marketing from the Northern Alberta Institute of Technology, and a Bachelor of Education from the University of Alberta in 1985.

References

External links
 
 
 
 Neil Turnbull at Soccerdonna.de 

1959 births
Living people
Sportspeople from Newcastle upon Tyne
English football managers
Canadian soccer coaches
Women's association football managers
Canada women's national soccer team managers
1999 FIFA Women's World Cup managers
Northern Alberta Institute of Technology alumni
University of Alberta alumni